St Margaret's Bus Station is located on Gravel Street to the north of Leicester City Centre, England. It is named after St Margaret's Church, which stands just across Burleys Way.

History 
The use of the site as a bus station dates back to the early 1940s.
The previous bus station was built in 1985 and at the time was a state-of-the-art arrival and departure point in the city. Councillor Derek Fryett, Chair of the Planning Committee opened it on 3 May 1985. The contractor was Costain Construction. Although considered one of the best stations in the country, Leicester City Council set about a programme of refurbishment in 2006. The major refurbishment was complete in March 2007 and the station was reopened by Councillor Patrick Kitterick on 24 May 2007.

Redevelopment
As part of a £14.3 million rebuilding scheme a new access road was completed in November 2020 allowing buses to access the A594 ring road directly from the bus station, shortening journey times.

During December 2020, Leicester City Council announced the bus station would close from 31 December for around 18 months to allow for a total redevelopment of the bus station and surrounding roads.

St Margaret's is the first carbon neutral bus station in the United Kingdom. An official opening day was held on Sunday 26 June 2022 by the Mayor of Leicester Sir Peter Soulsby, ahead of bus services returning the following day.

Services
Long-distance coach services operated by National Express operate from the new bus station with a purpose built travel centre and waiting facilities which opened on 5 July 2022.

Bus services serving the bus station are operated by Arriva Midlands, Centrebus, Diamond East Midlands, First Leicester and Kinchbus to outlying areas of Leicestershire including: South Wigston, Lutterworth, Rugby, Coventry, Hinckley, Market Bosworth, Coalville, Loughborough, Derby, Birstall, East Midlands Airport, Uppingham, Groby and Ratby.

Facilities
The new bus station facilities include a newsagents, cafe, public toilets, information kiosk, bicycle storage area and the National Express travel centre with waiting facilities for passengers.

References

External links
 Information about St. Margaret's bus station from Leicester City Council website
Historic photographs of the bus station

Transport in Leicester
History of Leicester
Buildings and structures in Leicester
Bus stations in the East Midlands